Harrick is a surname. Notable people with the surname include:

Jim Harrick (born 1938), American basketball coach 
Steve Harrick (1897–1988), American football, baseball, and wrestling coach

See also
Garrick (name)
Herrick (surname)